The Grantchester knot is a self-releasing, asymmetric way of tying a necktie.
Using the notation presented in The 85 Ways to Tie a Tie, it is a Lo Ri Lo Ri Co Li, finishing with Ro Li Co T.

References

External links

Open Directory Project Reference: Knots: Neckties

Necktie knots